Live at Vicar Street may refer to:

 Live at Vicar Street (The Dubliners album)
 Live at Vicar Street (Christy Moore album)